Gozzi is an Italian surname. Notable people with the surname include:

 Rasmus Gozzi (born 1993), Swedish artist
 Anders Gozzi (born 1967), Swedish professional ice hockey player 
 Carlo Gozzi (1720–1806), Italian dramatist
 Gasparo Gozzi (1713–1786), Italian critic and dramatist
 Patricia Gozzi (born 1950), French actress
 Simone Gozzi (born 1986), Italian footballer

Italian-language surnames